The Casa Consistorial de Tarazona, in Aragonese: Casa d'a Villa de Tarazona (Town Hall of Tarazona) is a building that houses the offices of the Council of the town of Tarazona, in Aragon, Spain. It is a good sample of the Spanish Renaissance art.

The town hall is located in the Plaza de España square.

History 

The building was built between the years 1557 and 1563 in the formerly called Plaza Mayor or del Mercado, to fulfill the function of Loncha, which housed oxen and a granary since the city already had a Council Houses in Plaza de la Magdalena, in the Cinto's neighbourhood.

The building, leaning against the rear in the stones of the Walls, was originally free, but now is located between shared walls. In mid-17th century this building became used as Town Hall.

Following the characteristics of all Lonchas, based in turn on the Aragonese private architecture, Tarazona had on the top floor with a "lookout" or gallery arches, with the function of false structure whose serves to protect the building, and topped in a blown wooden eaves.

From this viewpoint the municipal corporation/city council watched the bullfights that were held on the occasion of the patron feasts or particulars of each guild, as well as religious events, such as the procession of Corpus Christi through the square. This last function has been missing since the late 18th century due to the construction of the bullring situated next to the church of La Virgen del Río.

Description
The facade has three floors. In the exterior the building has a sculptural decoration that makes it unique and original and which was made in two moments.

Built in 1563

The facade is divided by a long frieze carved in plaster, dated in the years of its construction, which represents the departure of Charles V, Holy Roman Emperor (Charles I of Spain) after his coronation in Bologna, as emperor of the Holy Roman Empire by Pope Clement VII on 24 February 1530, event narrated by chronicler Heinrich Cornelius Agrippa.

From left to right on the 
frieze, the preparations for the feast, the guns accompanying the cortege, the squires carrying the banners, the royal entourage, the nobility, the Emperor and the pope under a canopy, and the passage of the entourage under a triumphal arch can all be distinguished.

The center belongs to the Emperor Charles V, the left is that of Aragon, and the right is that of Tarazona. All this decoration represents an iconographic program of imperial exaltation would find its justification in the death of the emperor coincided with the start of construction of the building.

However, the other reliefs on the facade of the main floor look different in terms of program and dating. First, it distinguish two allegorical figures representing Justice and Wisdom located one on each side of the main door, and the three Heraclean characters that refer to the founding of Tarazona. This iconographic program aims to reflect the virtues of good governance of the city, i.e. justice and wisdom, in which prudence and good advice were implicit, and the story of the founding of the town with the issues of Heracles, Cacus and a third character.

Addition in 1973
A radical restoration of the Town Hall was conducted between 1968 and 1973 under the direction of architect Fernando Chueca Goitia. Chueca created (but only from the pillars of the arches upwards) in the upper of third floor, a gallery of arches indiscriminately imitating the nearby Abbey of Santa María de Veruela, including the shields of the Veruelan abbots Hernando de Aragón and Lope Marco.

References 

 This text takes as reference the declaration of Bien de Interés Cultural published in the BOA No. 137 dated November 21, 2001  and conforms to the Article 13 LPI.

External links 

Buildings and structures in the Province of Zaragoza
Buildings and structures completed in 1563
Renaissance architecture in Aragon
City and town halls in Spain
Tarazona